Carlos Roberto Velho Cirne Lima, also referred to as Carlos Cirne Lima, (born in 1931, in :Porto Alegre, :Rio Grande do Sul, :Brasil) is a Brazilian contemporary dialectical philosopher.
He obtained his doctor-degree in 1958 at the :University of Innsbruck, :Austria.
Was a full professor at the universities UFRGS (Universidade Federal do Rio Grande do Sul), PUCRS (Pontífica Universidade do Rio Grande do Sul) in Porto Alegre, and UNISINOS in São Leopoldo, Rio Grande do Sul.

Books in English
CIRNE-LIMA, CARLOS Personal Faith: A Metaphysical Inquiry, Herder, 1965. 206 pp.
Cirne-Lima, Carlos Dialectics for Beginners, PUCRS, 1997
Cirne-Lima, Carlos Beyond Hegel, Editora da Universidade de Caxias do Sul / RS

Books in Portuguese
Depois de Hegel. Uma reconstrução crítica do sistema neoplatônico (2006)
Dialética e auto-organização (2003, organizador, com Luiz Rohden)
Nós e o Absoluto (2001, organizador, com R. C. Costa e C. Almeida)
Dialética para Todos (2005) [CD Rom] feito em parceria com Alípio Lippstein, Maurício N.Santos, Carlos Dohrn e Maria Tomaselli
Dialética para Principiantes (1996)
Sobre a contradição (1993)
Realismo e Dialética. A Analogia como dialética do Realismo (1967)

Book in German
Der personale Glaube. Eine erkenntnismetaphysische Studie (1959)

References

External links
 personal website
 http://www2.uol.com.br/vyaestelar/entrevista_filosofia.htm

Systems scientists
Brazilian philosophers
Living people
1931 births